Gerald Barry Sanderson (12 May 1881 – 3 October 1964) was an English first-class cricketer who played two first-class matches, these coming almost 22 years apart. He batted in only one innings in each.

His first game was for Warwickshire against London County in 1901; he was run out for nought. His second appearance, for Worcestershire against Northamptonshire in 1923, again ended with him being run out, this time for 16.

Sanderson was born in Liverpool; he died aged 83 in Westminster, London.

His father Richard had played once for Lancashire in 1870.

External links
 

1881 births
1964 deaths
English cricketers
Warwickshire cricketers
Worcestershire cricketers
Cricketers from Liverpool
People educated at Malvern College
Alumni of the University of Oxford